HMS C32 was one of 38 C-class submarines built for the Royal Navy in the first decade of the 20th century. The boat ran aground in the Baltic in 1917 and had to be destroyed to prevent her capture.

Design and description
The C-class boats of the 1907–08 and subsequent Naval Programmes were modified to improve their speed, both above and below the surface. They displaced  on the surface and  submerged. The C-class submarines had a crew of two officers and fourteen ratings.

For surface running, the boats were powered by a single 12-cylinder  Vickers petrol engine that drove one propeller shaft. When submerged the propeller was driven by a  electric motor. They could reach  on the surface and  underwater.

The boats were armed with two 18-inch (45 cm) torpedo tubes in the bow. They could carry a pair of reload torpedoes, but generally did not as they would have to remove an equal weight of fuel in compensation.

Construction and career
HMS C32 was built by Vickers, Barrow. She was laid down on 12 January 1909 and was commissioned on 19 November 1909. The boat was involved in North Sea operations from 1914 to 1916. C32 was also involved in the British submarine operations in the Baltic in 1916 and 1917. During her patrol in the Gulf of Riga in the Baltic, she sank a merchant ship. The boat ran ashore and was blown up in the Gulf of Riga on 22 October 1917.

Notes

References

External links
 'Submarine losses 1904 to present day' - Royal Navy Submarine Museum

 

British C-class submarines
Royal Navy ship names
Ships built in Barrow-in-Furness
World War I shipwrecks in the Baltic Sea
Maritime incidents in 1917
1909 ships
Shipwrecks in the Gulf of Riga